Stoke is a village on Hayling Island in the Havant district, in the county of Hampshire, England. The village lies on the Havant A3023 road between North Hayling and South Hayling. The village is closest to Langstone Harbour, opposite the city of Portsmouth.

Villages in Hampshire
Populated coastal places in Hampshire
Hayling Island